Pauropsalta is a genus of cicadas belonging to the family Cicadidae, first described in 1904 by Frederic Webster Goding and Walter Wilson Froggatt.

The species of this genus are found in all states and territories of Australia.

Species
Species:
Pauropsalta accola  (nomen nudum)
Pauropsalta accola 
Pauropsalta adelphe 
Pauropsalta adelphe   (nomen nudum)
Pauropsalta agasta 
Pauropsalta agasta   (nomen nudum)
Pauropsalta borealis 
Pauropsalta castanea 
Pauropsalta confinis 
Pauropsalta confinis 
Pauropsalta conflua 
Pauropsalta conflua   (nomen nudum)
Pauropsalta contigua 
Pauropsalta contigua   (nomen nudum)
Pauropsalta elgneri 
Pauropsalta ewarti 
Pauropsalta ewarti   (nomen nudum)
Pauropsalta extensa 
Pauropsalta prolongata 
Pauropsalta extrema 
Pauropsalta herveyensis   (nomen nudum)
Pauropsalta herveyensis 
Pauropsalta infrasila 
Pauropsalta infuscata 
Pauropsalta juncta 
Pauropsalta katherina 
Pauropsalta kriki 
Pauropsalta melanopygia 
Pauropsalta mneme 
Pauropsalta leurensis 
Pauropsalta opaca 
Pauropsalta prolongata 
Pauropsalta rubra 
Pauropsalta similis 
Pauropsalta similis   (nomen nudum)
Pauropsalta sinavilla 
Pauropsalta sinavilla   (nomen nudum)
Pauropsalta stigmatica 
Pauropsalta walkeri

References

Cicadidae
Hemiptera genera